The 1947 FIBA European Championship, commonly called FIBA EuroBasket 1947, was the fifth FIBA EuroBasket regional basketball championship, held by FIBA. Fourteen national teams affiliated with the International Basketball Federation (FIBA) took part in the competition. Czechoslovakia hosted the contest, which was held in Prague.

Results
The 1947 competition consisted of a preliminary round, with two groups of four teams and two groups of three teams each.  Each team played the other teams in its group once.  The top two teams in each of the groups advanced into four-team semifinal groups 1 and 2 and were guaranteed a top-eight finish, with the remaining teams playing in three-team groups 3 and 4 for places 9–14.

Each team again played each other team in its group once.  The bottom team in each of the three-team groups played its counterpart for 13th and 14th places.  Similarly, middle teams in those groups played each other for 11th and 12th places and top teams played for 9th and 10th.  The top eight places were determined in the same fashion, with top teams playing each other for gold and silver, second place teams in each playing for bronze and 4th, and so on.

First round

Group A

Group B

Group C

Group D

Second round
The middle team of each of the groups of three did not compete in the second round, as they advanced directly to a 5th/6th place playoff in the final round.  The top team of each of those groups played one of the top two teams of the group of four, with rankings 1st–4th at stake.  Similarly, the bottom team in each group of three played one of the two lower teams in the group of four in a semifinal for 7th–10th places.

Upper bracket

Group 1

Group 2

Lower bracket

Group 3

Group 4

Playoff games
Each team had one final game in order to determine their tournament ranking

13th place:

11th place:

9th place:

7th place:

5th place:

3rd place:

Championship:

Final standings

Team rosters
1. Soviet Union: Otar Korkia, Stepas Butautas, Joann Lõssov, Nodar Dzhordzhikiya, Ilmar Kullam, Anatoly Konev, Evgeny Alekseev, Alexander Moiseev, Justinas Lagunavičius, Kazys Petkevičius, Yuri Ushakov, Vytautas Kulakauskas, Vasili Kolpakov, Sergei Tarasov (Coach: Pavel Tsetlin)

2. Czechoslovakia: Ivan Mrázek, Miloš Bobocký, Jiří Drvota, Josef Ezr, Jan Kozák, Gustav Hermann, Miroslav Vondráček, Ladislav Trpkoš, Karel Bělohradský, Miroslav Dostál, Milan Fraňa, Václav Krása, Josef Toms, Emil Velenský (Coach: Josef Fleischlinger)

3. Egypt: Youssef Mohammed Abbas, Fouad Abdelmeguid el-Kheir, Guido Acher, Maurice Calife, Gabriel Armand "Gaby" Catafago, Abdelrahman Hafez Ismail, Zaki Selim Harari, Hassan Moawad, Hussein Kamel Montasser, Wahid Chafik Saleh, Albert Fahmy Tadros, Zaki Yehia

4. Belgium: Ange Hollanders, Henri Hollanders, Gustave Poppe, Emile Kets, Georges Baert, Henri Hermans, Julien Meuris, Rene Steurbaut, Francois de Pauw, Henri Coosemans, Guillaume van Damme, Armand van Wambeke, Fernand Rossius, Joseph Pirard (Coach: Raymond Briot)

6. Poland: Jacek Arlet, Ludwik Barszczewski, Bohdan Bartoszewicz, Jerzy Dowgird, Edward Jarczyński, Henryk Jaźnicki, Władysław Maleszewski, Romuald Markowski, Zbigniew Resich, Paweł Stok, Tadeusz Ulatowski, Józef Żyliński

13. Yugoslavia: Tullio Rochlitzer, Mirko Marjanović, Miodrag Stefanović, Božo Grkinić, Ladislav Demšar, Nebojša Popović, Zlatko Kovačević, Aleksandar Gec, Aleksandar Milojković, Srđan Kalember, Zorko Cvetković, Ottone Olivieri, Božidar Munćan (Coach: Stevica Čolović)

External links
FIBA Europe EuroBasket 1947
Eurobasket.com 1947 EChampionship

1947
1947 in basketball
1947 in Czechoslovak sport
International basketball competitions hosted by Czechoslovakia
Sports competitions in Prague
April 1947 sports events in Europe
May 1947 sports events in Europe
1940s in Prague